School District 22 Vernon is a school district in Okanagan region of British Columbia. It includes schools in Vernon, Lumby and Coldstream.

Schools

See also
List of school districts in British Columbia

Education in Vernon, British Columbia
School districts in the Okanagan
22